Sandusky is an unincorporated community located in the town of Washington, Sauk County, Wisconsin, United States.

The community was named after Sandusky, Ohio, the native home of an early settler.

Notes

Unincorporated communities in Sauk County, Wisconsin
Unincorporated communities in Wisconsin